The , also known as the Royal Hotel or , is an abandoned, unfinished hotel in Kitanakagusuku, Okinawa. It sits no more than 50 meters from the walls of Nakagusuku Castle. As of May 2020, the hotel has been fully demolished.

Background 

It is believed to have been built by a wealthy businessman from Naha in order to take advantage of the 1975 Okinawa Ocean Exposition. The hill directly South of Nakagusuku Castle was chosen as the construction site because of the view of both the Pacific Ocean and the East China Sea. There were warnings given by monks from a nearby Buddhist temple that the site was home to numerous graves and sacred sites, but they were initially ignored. After many construction accidents, the workers refused to finish the complex as they felt that the place was cursed. The businessman tried to prove the place was not cursed by spending a night at the unfinished hotel only to go completely mad the next day and disappeared soon after. It now sits empty and overgrown by vegetation.

Name 
The hotel's most common name in Japanese is written as 中城高原ホテル跡 (Nakagusuku Takahara/Kogen Hotel site). The name is less of a name and more of a description. 高原 can be pronounced as either Takahara or Kōgen, the latter meaning plateau. An alternative name, Royal Hotel, is the supposed name that the builder intended for it, and is evidenced by the faded word "Royal" painted above the entrance.

References

External links 
http://gpzagogo.s8.xrea.com/nakagusukuhotel.html

Buildings and structures completed in 1975
Buildings and structures in Okinawa Prefecture
Unfinished buildings and structures